Safed Khoon or Safed Khun is an Urdu play by Agha Hashar Kashmiri, based on Shakespeare's King Lear. It was published in 1907.

References

Plays by Agha Hashar Kashmiri
1907 plays
Urdu-language plays
Plays and musicals based on King Lear
Plays and musicals based on works by William Shakespeare